Professor Bryan Horrigan (born 1962) is an Australian legal academic and the Executive Dean of the Faculty of Law at Monash University in Australia since January 2013. He previously held positions at Monash University as the Louis Waller Chair in Law and Associate Dean (Research). Formerly a senior associate and long-standing consultant with a leading international law firm, he holds a doctorate in law from Oxford University under a Rhodes Scholarship.

Education
Bryan Horrigan was born in Brisbane, Queensland, Australia. He was educated at St. Joseph's College, Gregory Terrace (Brisbane) and the University of Queensland (BA, LLB), where he was awarded a Rhodes Scholarship. He was subsequently awarded a D. Phil. in Law from University College, Oxford.

Professional career
Professor Bryan Horrigan is the Executive Dean of the Faculty of Law at Monash University in Australia. Previously holding positions at Monash University as the Louis Waller Chair in Law and Associate Dean (Research) following positions at the Queenland University of Technology and University of Canberra, he became Executive Dean of the Faculty of Law at Monash University in early January 2013, succeeding Emeritus Professor Arie Freiberg as Dean. Formerly a senior associate and long-standing consultant with a leading international law firm, he holds a doctorate in law from Oxford University under a Rhodes Scholarship. He is the longest-serving current law dean in Victoria.

At Monash University, Bryan is a member of the Vice-Chancellor’s Executive Committee and the Monash-Penn State Alliance Steering Committee. He has held board positions on the Cranlana Centre for Ethical Leadership and as a director of Monash South Africa. He has mentored and been referee for numerous students who have won prestigious scholarships (such as Menzies Scholarships, Sir John Monash Scholarships, Schwarzman Scholarships, and Rhodes Scholarships), and many of his former research assistants have gone on to become judges’ associates to judges and chief justices, including in the Supreme Court of Victoria, the Federal Court of Australia, and the High Court of Australia.

In 2010, he was appointed to a three-member Australian Government expert panel, charged with investigating the regulation of unconscionable business conduct and problematic franchising behaviours, whose recommendations for reform were accepted by the Australian Government, resulting in the Australian Parliament making changes to three major pieces of national economic regulation. He was also part of the expert reference group for the Finkel Review of Australia’s electricity and energy market, as well as for the work by the Centre for Policy Development leading to the publication of landmark legal opinions on the responsibilities and liabilities of companies and their boards for managing climate change risks and disclosures.

Core Expertise 
Bryan's published research has been cited by the Queensland Court of Appeal and speeches by high-level judges, as well as in public submissions and reports, parliamentary committee and regulatory reports, law reform commission proposals, and other academic work. He has spoken and published internationally in the fields of internationalisation of law, judicial decision-making, public sector governance, corporate social responsibility, unconscionable business conduct, and good faith in commercial transactions.

His book entitled Corporate Social Responsibility in the 21st Century: Debates, Models, and Practices Across Government, Law, and Business was published in 2010 by Edward Elgar Publications, and is frequently cited.

Achievements 
In his time as Executive Dean, Professor Horrigan has steered the Faculty towards having:

 new named professorial chairs (in criminal and corporate law) 
 the first and only Clinical Guarantee of any Australian law school, under which every commencing law student has the opportunity for a transformational work-situated legal clinical experience, in contributing to access to justice in Victoria and elsewhere;
 a moot court
 a growing cohort of former high-level Victorian and other Australian judges as Law Faculty members; and major initiatives such as:

- joint hosting with the Supreme Court of Victoria of a conference on the Victorian contributions and comparative lessons for human rights jurisprudence on charters and bills of rights

- the Open Justice Project pro bono collaboration with the Victorian Bar;

- the Eleos Justice initiative on capital punishment in partnership with the Capital Punishment Justice Project and with funding from the Australian Government; and 

- a state and national commercial law seminar series in partnership with the Victorian Supreme Court, Federal Court of Australia, and peak bodies form the legal profession.

Publications

Contributor
Horrigan has contributed chapters to the following academic and professional texts:
 1994. Enforcing Securities
 1994. Foreign Investment in Australia
 1995. Equity: Issues and Trends
 1996. Interpreting Constitutions
 1997. Commercial Implications of Native Title
 1998. Government Law and Policy: Commercial Aspects (ed., contrib.)
 1999. Corporatisation and Privatisation in Australia
 1999. Guarantees and Solicitors' Certificates
 2001. Human Rights and Commercial Law
 2002. Oxford Companion to the High Court of Australia
 2003. From Bureaucracy to Business Enterprise
 2005. Handbook of Corporate Legal Responsibility

Author
Horrigan's books are:
 2000. Horrors' Hints: Helpful Hints on the Theory and Practice of Legal Research and Analysis for Students, Academics and Practitioners
 Faculty of Law, Kelvin Grove, Qld.: Queensland University of Technology,  (pbk.)
 2003. Adventures in Law and Justice: Exploring Big Legal Questions in Everyday Life
 Law at Large, Sydney: University of New South Wales Press,  (pbk.), "a down-to-earth explanation of topical and newsworthy law-and-justice dilemmas". 
 2008. Corporate Social Responsibility in the 21st Century: Debates, Models and Practices Across Government, Law and Business
 Cheltenham, UK & Northampton, MA: Edward Elgar Publishing,  (hbk.),  (pbk.)

References

1962 births
Living people
Australian Rhodes Scholars
20th-century Australian lawyers
Academic staff of Macquarie University
Academic staff of Monash University
People educated at St Joseph's College, Gregory Terrace
University of Queensland alumni
Alumni of University College, Oxford
21st-century Australian lawyers